Rhyacionia is a genus of moths belonging to the subfamily Olethreutinae of the family Tortricidae.

Species
Rhyacionia adana Heinrich, 1923 – Adana pine tip moth
Rhyacionia aktita Miller, in Powell & Miller, 1978
Rhyacionia aureola Powell, in Powell & Miller, 1978
Rhyacionia blanchardi Miller, in Powell & Miller, 1978
Rhyacionia buoliana ([Denis & Schiffermüller], 1775) – European pine shoot moth
Rhyacionia busckana Heinrich, 1923 – red pine tip moth
Rhyacionia bushnelli (Busck, 1914)
Rhyacionia cibriani Miller, 1988
Rhyacionia dativa Heinrich, 1928
Rhyacionia dolichotubula Liu & Bai, 1984
Rhyacionia duplana (Hübner, [1811-1813])
Rhyacionia flammicolor Powell, in Powell & Miller, 1978
Rhyacionia frustrana (Scudder, in Comstock, 1880) – Nantucket pine tip moth
Rhyacionia fumosana Powell, in Powell & Miller, 1978
Rhyacionia granti Miller, 1985 – jack pine tip moth
Rhyacionia hafneri (Rebel, 1937)
Rhyacionia insulariana Liu, in Liu & Bai, 1985
Rhyacionia jenningsi Powell, in Powell & Miller, 1978
Rhyacionia leptotubula Liu & Bai, 1984
Rhyacionia logaea Durrant, 1911
Rhyacionia malgassana (Saalmuller, 1880)
Rhyacionia maritimana Prse, 1981
Rhyacionia martinana Powell, in Powell & Miller, 1978
Rhyacionia miniatana (Staudinger, 1871)
Rhyacionia monophylliana (Kearfott, 1907)
Rhyacionia multilineata Powell, in Powell & Miller, 1978
Rhyacionia neomexicana (Dyar, 1903)
Rhyacionia pallidicosta Razowski, 1999
Rhyacionia pallifasciata Powell, in Powell & Miller, 1978
Rhyacionia pasadenana (Kearfott, 1907)
Rhyacionia pinicolana (Doubleday, 1850)
Rhyacionia pinivorana (Lienig & Zeller, 1846)
Rhyacionia rigidana (Fernald, in Comstock, 1880) – pitch pine tip moth
Rhyacionia rubigifasciola Miller, 1988
Rhyacionia salmonicolor Powell, in Powell & Miller, 1978
Rhyacionia sonia Miller, 1967 – yellow jack pine tip moth
Rhyacionia subcervinana (Walsingham, 1879)
Rhyacionia subtropica Miller, 1961 – subtropical pine tip moth
Rhyacionia vernalis Nasu & Kawahara, 2004
Rhyacionia versicolor Powell, in Powell & Miller, 1978
Rhyacionia walsinghami (Rebel, 1896)
Rhyacionia washiyai Kono & Sawamoto, 1940
Rhyacionia zozana (Kearfott, 1907)

See also
List of Tortricidae genera

References

External links
Tortricid.net

Eucosmini
Tortricidae genera
Taxa named by Jacob Hübner